Brett Krutzsch (born September 17, 1979) is a scholar of religion at the Center for Religion and Media at New York University, where he serves as Editor of the online magazine the Revealer and teaches in NYU's Department of Religious Studies. He is the author of the 2019 book, Dying to Be Normal: Gay Martyrs and the Transformation of American Sexual Politics from Oxford University Press. His writing has appeared in the Washington Post, Newsday, the Advocate, and he has been featured on NPR.

Education and personal life 
Krutzsch received his B.A. from Emory University and M.A. from  New York University. He earned his Ph.D. in religion from Temple University, studying under Rebecca Alpert. In 2013, Krutzsch married Kevin Williams. They live in Manhattan, New York.

Career
Before he joined NYU's Center for Religion and Media in 2019, Krutzsch taught at Haverford College as a Visiting Assistant Professor of Religion, and at the College of Wooster as the Walter D. Foss Visiting Assistant Professor of Religious Studies and Women's, Gender, and Sexuality Studies.

Krutzsch is an expert on LGBTQ history and religion in America. His first book, Dying to Be Normal: Gay Martyrs and the Transformation of American Sexual Politics, from Oxford University Press examines how religion shaped LGBTQ political action in the United States. The book explores how LGBTQ activists used the deaths of Matthew Shepard, Harvey Milk, Tyler Clementi, Brandon Teena, F.C. Martinez, campaigns like the It Gets Better Project, and national tragedies like the Pulse nightclub shooting for political purposes to promote assimilation. In 2020, Dying to Be Normal was named a Lambda Literary Award finalist for best LGBTQ nonfiction book of the year.

Krutzsch has published on religion and LGBTQ politics in several scholarly journals including Theology and Sexuality, the Journal of Popular Culture,  and Biblical Interpretation. In 2015, Krutzsch received the LGBT Religious History Award for his research and writing on Matthew Shepard. His public scholarship about religion and LGBTQ issues has been featured in the Advocate, Medium, Indianapolis Star, NPR's "On Point," and on multiple podcasts, including the Radio GAG (Gays Against Guns) show and the Straight White American Jesus podcast. In 2019, Krutzsch was selected for the inaugural Sacred Writes public scholarship fellows program funded by the Henry R. Luce Foundation.

Since 2019, Krutzsch has been the editor of The Revealer, an online magazine about religion and society published by the Center for Religion and Media at NYU.

References 

Living people
American religion academics
Emory University alumni
New York University alumni
Temple University alumni
Gay academics
21st-century American male writers
American gay writers
1979 births
21st-century LGBT people